Obie Patterson (born March 7, 1938) is an American politician. He was previously a Democratic member of the Maryland Senate from the 26th district in Prince George's County. He served on the Prince George's County Council representing District 8, and in the Maryland House of Delegates representing the 26th district.

Background
Patterson was born in Lancaster, South Carolina on March 7, 1938. He attended Johnson C. Smith University in Charlotte, North Carolina, where he earned a Bachelor of Science degree in biology in 1965, and the University of Florida, where he earned a Master of Arts degree in public administration in 1971. After graduating, he served in a variety of roles at the U.S. Department of Agriculture.

Political career
Patterson was a member of House of Delegates from January 11, 1995, and to January 10, 2007. He served as the Chair of the Legislative Black Caucus of Maryland from 2002 to 2004. In 2006, Patterson unsuccessfully ran for Maryland Senate in District 26, losing to former state Delegate C. Anthony Muse in the Democratic primary by a 55%-45% margin.

In 2010, Patterson was elected to serve on the Prince George's County Council in District 8. Termed out of running for re-election, he ran for the Maryland Senate in 2018, seeking to succeed C. Anthony Muse, who decided against running for another term to run for county executive of Prince George's County.

In September 2018, the Prince George's County Republican Party filed an ethics complaint against Patterson, claiming that his county government staff used a government email address to distribute an invitation to a reception featuring Democratic gubernatorial nominee Ben Jealous. He won the general election in November 2018 with 92.5 percent of the vote and was sworn in on January 9, 2019. Later that month, President of the Maryland Senate Thomas V. Miller Jr. appointed Patterson to serve as the deputy majority whip of the Senate Democratic Caucus.

On April 6, 2022, he announced that he would not seek re-election to the Maryland Senate.

Political positions

Development initiatives
Patterson opposed Governor Larry Hogan's proposal to construct a pro football stadium on a large parcel of federal land in Oxon Hill, saying "I don't know how anyone can think about bringing the Redskins there without some drastic increase in better transportation".

Environment
During the 2021 legislative session, Patterson voted for the Climate Solutions Now Act, saying that he "reluctantly" supported the legislation. In the same year, he introduced various environmental bills, including:
 Senate Bill 70, which would require the state to establish uniform standards for mold assessment and remediation
 Senate Bill 121, which would require the Commission on Environmental Justice and Sustainable Communities to develop policy recommendations on clan energy projects and investments to benefit low-income communities
 Senate Bill 151, which would amend the Maryland State Constitution to establish a right to a healthy environment

Health care
During the 2006 legislative session, Patterson voted to override Governor Bob Ehrlich's veto of the Fair Share Health Care Fund Act, which would require Walmart to pay more for employee health care.

During the 2019 legislative session, Patterson refused to cast a vote on the End-of-Line Option Act, which would have provided palliative care to terminally ill adults, causing the bill to die in a tied 23–23 vote. On his decision not to vote, Patterson said he had no regrets about decision, adding, "I did not cast a vote simply because I could not bring myself to move right or left on the bill and therefore I didn't vote on all. I don't know if it is [a violation of Senate rules] but I had to vote my conscience and that's what I did". In 2020, when the bill was reintroduced, Patterson said that he would cast a vote if the bill came up for a vote again, but did not say how he planned to vote.

Policing
During the 2021 legislative session, Patterson introduced legislation that would allow police officers to arrest a person based on witness testimony and video evidence. Patterson voted in favor of the General Assembly's police reform package.

Social issues
During the 2001 legislative session, Patterson voted in favor of legislation to implement a two-year moratorium on Maryland's use of capital punishment. The bill passed the Maryland House of Delegates by a vote of 82–54. He also voted in favor of legislation to add gays and lesbians to the state's anti-discrimination law, which passed in a 88–50 vote.

During the 2021 legislative session, Patterson introduced legislation that would rename Indian Head Highway after former President Barack Obama. The bill died in the Maryland Senate after its first reading a month later. He also introduced a bill that would replace Columbus Day with Indigenous Peoples' Day.

Electoral history

References

Democratic Party members of the Maryland House of Delegates
African-American state legislators in Maryland
Johnson C. Smith University alumni
University of Florida alumni
1938 births
Living people
21st-century American politicians
Democratic Party Maryland state senators
21st-century African-American politicians
20th-century African-American people